Fafa is a given name. Notable people with the name include:

 Fafá de Belém (born 1956), Brazilian singer
 Fafà Picault (born 1991), American soccer player
 Fafa Sanyang, Gambian politician and civil servant